Terrell Maurice Gausha (born September 9, 1987) is an American professional boxer who challenged for the WBA and IBO light middleweight titles in 2017. As an amateur he represented the United States at the 2012 Summer Olympics in the middleweight division.

Early life and education
A 2005 graduate of Glenville High School in Cleveland, Ohio, Gausha has been boxing since the age of 10.  He started boxing under coach Bob Davis at The Glenville Recreation Center. He was later coached by Renard Safo.

Amateur career
After winning the USA National Title in 2009, Gausha competed in the 2009 World Amateur Boxing Championships and several international dual matches.  Between 2010 and 2012, Gausha participated in the World Series of Boxing. His record in the World Series was 5–2.

On February 26, 2012 Gausha entered the USA Championship tournament in Colorado Springs, Colorado as an unseeded at-large entry.  He upset the field, defeating a National Golden Gloves Champion (Jesse Hart), the #2 National Boxer and the previous #1 boxer. Gausha won 6 fights in a 7-day span. On March 3, 2012 he captured the USA National Championship by defeating the previous champion, Caleb Plant. Winners of the 2011 US Olympic trials who failed to qualify for the Olympic Tournament at the 2011 AIBA World Boxing Championships, like middleweight Jesse Hart, had to return to the 2012 US Championships to once again battle for the chance to represent Team USA. Winners of the 2012 US Championships would earn the opportunity to qualify for the Olympic field at the AIBA Olympic Qualifying Tournament for the Americas.

On May 9, 2012 Gausha won the quarterfinal match of the Americas Olympic Qualification Tournament in Rio De Janeiro, Brazil.  That victory gave him a guaranteed berth in the 2012 Olympics.  On May 13, 2012 he won the gold medal in the Americas Olympic Qualification Tournament, defeating Junior Castillo 6–2.

On July 28, 2012 Gausha won his first Olympic bout, defeating Armenian boxer Andranik Hakobyan, with a sensational knock out. However, he would be eliminated from the Olympics because of a controversial decision to India's Vijender Singh in his next bout.

Professional career
On November 9, 2012 Gausha began his professional career by knocking out Dustin Caplinger during a show televised on ShoBox. Gausha was knocked down on his fourth professional fight by William Waters. Gausha won the four-round bout by unanimous decision (38-37, 38–37, 38–37).

On August 12, 2017 it was announced that Gausha would challenge WBA (Super) and IBO champion Erislandy Lara. The fight was part of a light middleweight triple header on October 14, 2017 at the Barclays Center in New York City. Other fights on the card included Jermell Charlo's mandatory title defence against top prospect Erickson Lubin and Jarrett Hurd defending his IBF title against former champion Austin Trout. Lara knocked down Gausha en route to a 12-round unanimous decision to retain his world titles. Lara used his accurate jab and left hand, putting on a clinic winning with the scorecards 116–111 and 117–110 twice in his favour. Due to lack of action, boos were heard from the crowd.

In his next fight, Gausha bounced back with an easy first-round TKO win against Joey Hernandez.

On May 25, 2019, Gausha, ranked No. 13 by the WBA, fought Austin Trout, who was ranked No. 6 by the WBC at the time. Gausha looked dominant throughout most of the fight, the announcers giving him a wide lead on the scorecards. The judges, however, saw it differently, with one judge scoring it 99-91 for Gausha, another judge scoring it 96-94 for Trout, and the third judge scoring it even, 95-95.

Gausha's following fight was a WBC super welterweight title eliminator, against young talent Erickson Lubin. The fight was not packed with a lot of action from both fighters, but Lubin's performance was more convincing as he managed to win most of the rounds. Lubin defeated Gausha comfortably on the scorecards, 118–110, 116-112 and 115–113.

Gausha fought Jamontay Clark on March, 13th 2021. Gausha knocked him out in the second round.

Professional boxing record

References

External links
 

1987 births
Living people
Boxers at the 2012 Summer Olympics
Olympic boxers of the United States
Boxers from Cleveland
Light-middleweight boxers
American male boxers
African-American boxers
21st-century African-American sportspeople
20th-century African-American people